Swords Against Darkness III is an anthology of fantasy stories, edited by Andrew J. Offutt. It was first published in paperback by Zebra Books in March 1978.

Summary
The book collects thirteen short stories and novelettes, one poem and one essay by various fantasy authors, together with a foreword by Offutt.

Contents
"Foreword" (Andrew J. Offutt)
"The Pit of Wings" (Ramsey Campbell) 
"The Sword of Spartacus" (Richard L. Tierney) 
"Servitude" (Wayne Hooks) 
"Descales' Skull" (David C. Smith) 
"In the Balance" (Tanith Lee) 
"Tower of Darkness" (David Madison) 
"The Mantichore" (David Drake) 
"Revenant" (poem) (Kathleen Resch) 
"Rite of Kings" (Jon DeCles) 
"The Mating Web" (Robert E. Vardeman) 
"The Guest of Dzinganji" (Manly Wade Wellman) 
"The Hag" (Darrell Schweitzer) 
"A Kingdom Won" (Geo W. Proctor) 
"Swordslinger" (M. A. Washil) 
"On Thud and Blunder" (essay) (Poul Anderson)

External links
ISFD entry for Swords Against Darkness III

1978 anthologies
Fantasy anthologies
Zebra Books books